Llyn Nantlle Uchaf (Upper Nantlle Lake) is a lake in the Nantlle Valley, Gwynedd, Wales. The lake forms the foreground in Richard Wilson's painting "Snowdon from Llyn Nantlle".

Llyn Nantlle Isaf (Lower Nantlle Lake) no longer exists as it was drained to protect the slate works.

References

Llanllyfni
Nantlle Uchaf
Nantlle Uchaf
Dyffryn Nantlle